Scream for Help is a 1984 British horror film directed by Michael Winner, written by Tom Holland, and starring Rachael Kelly, David Brooks, and Marie Masters. Set in New Rochelle, New York, the film follows a teenage girl who discovers that her stepfather is trying to murder her and her mother, but her repeated claims of her findings are disbelieved by those around her. Former Led Zeppelin member John Paul Jones composed the musical score.

Plot
In New Rochelle, New York, Christie, a teenage girl discovers that her stepfather Paul is trying to murder her and her mother Karen for her money, but when she tries to tell other people about it, no one will believe her. After a maintenance worker dies in the basement, Christie believes Paul set the trap for her mother after she saw him leave the basement the previous night. Christie begins following Paul everywhere and discovers he is having an affair with a young attractive woman named Brenda. She is caught by Brenda's brother Lacey but manages to run away. Paul convinces Karen that Brenda is a client of his and she believes him over her daughter.

Christie convinces Josh, her best friend Janey's boyfriend, to accompany her to catch Paul, but the brakes to her mother's car have been tampered with, almost killing them. Christie and Janey discover Paul and Brenda at a motel and run when Paul sees them. Janey tells Christie she is pregnant by Josh, but moments later is killed in a hit and run by an unseen driver. Christie tells the police that Paul killed Janey, intending to kill her, but she is not believed. Josh sticks up for Christie after she is bullied and blamed for Janey's death. Later, she loses her virginity to Josh but they are interrupted by Paul, who orders Josh to leave; when Christie goes to the bathroom, she notices gas, now suspecting that Paul is trying to kill her too (as she would be entitled to her mother's inheritance before he would be). Karen also falls down the stairs after a trap Paul set for her, putting her in a wheelchair. Christie takes a picture of Paul and Brenda having sex but drops the picture and is seen; while retrieving the picture she overhears that Brenda and Lacey are in fact a married couple who plan to blackmail Paul after he kills Karen and Christie. She shows her mother the picture and Paul is ordered to leave.

At midnight, Paul, Brenda and Lacey invade the house and force Christie and Karen to the basement, revealing their plans to kill them both at 2 a.m. and blame it on a burglar. Christie tells Paul about the real relationship between Brenda and Lacey, which angers him. Christie tricks Brenda into letting her out to go to the bathroom while Karen cuts the electricity to the house from the basement, giving Christie a chance to run and stab both Lacey and Paul. After Brenda attacks Karen and turns the lights back, on Christie surrenders herself to Lacey and both victims are forced back to the basement, where they devise another plan to escape by wetting the fuse box.

At 2 a.m., they are ordered upstairs but are interrupted by Josh knocking at the door. Lacey orders Christie to open the door and get rid of him. Josh is suspicious and informs the police. When the electricity goes off, both mother and daughter flee their attackers. Lacey orders Brenda to go to the basement and turn the lights back on, but the wet fuse box electrocutes Brenda. After almost catching Karen, Lacey runs to the basement after hearing Brenda's scream and finds her dead. Christie tricks Paul into believing she is in her bathroom when Paul enters the gas filled bathroom with a lighter; it explodes and he is killed. Josh saves Christie from the burning house.

With their ordeal over, Christie and Karen reside at another house temporarily when Josh comes over to kiss Christie; Lacey appears and hits Josh and plans to kill Christie for what she did to Brenda. Christie pulls out a knife and stabs Lacey through the stomach, killing him.

Cast

Production
The exterior sequences were filmed on location in New Rochelle, New York, while interior sequences were shot in London.

Release

Critical response
Derek Malcolm of The Guardian wrote that director Winner "pushes his plot to further and further levels of implausiblity, and ends with a bloodbath that looks ominously like a practise run for the forthcoming Death Wish III."

Home media
Scream for Help was released on VHS, Betamax, and LaserDisc in North America by Karl-Lorimar Home Video on 15 October 1985. The film's home video release received a significant promotional campaign in retail markets, including special brochures, posters, counter cards, and a cardboard standup. Stuart Karl, then-president of Karl-Lorimar, commented at the time: "To our knowledge, this is the first time in home video history that a company has approached advertising for a home video feature as if it were a theatrical release."
 
The film has not been issued on DVD but a Blu-ray from Scream Factory was released on 18 September 2018.

Soundtrack

References

External links

1984 films
1984 horror films
American horror thriller films
American mystery horror films
American psychological horror films
American psychological thriller films
Films about child abuse
Films directed by Michael Winner
Films produced by Michael Winner
Films set in New York (state)
Films shot in New York (state)
Films shot in England
Home invasions in film
1980s English-language films
1980s American films